Events from the year 2017 in Somalia

Incumbents

 President – Hassan Sheikh Mohamud (until 8 February); Mohamed Abdullahi Mohamed
 Prime Minister – Omar Abdirashid Ali Sharmarke (until 1 March); Hassan Ali Khaire

Events
 2 January – 2 January 2017 Mogadishu bombings.
 8 February – the Somali presidential election, 2017 concluded with Mohamed Abdullahi Mohamed elected as the new president
 11 August – The Minister of Foreign Affairs Yusuf Garaad Omar wrote a letter to the US Ambassador alleging that al-Shabaab had gained control over uranium mining in the Galmudug region, and were shipping the material to Iran.

Deaths
 8 February – Mohamud Muse Hersi, politician.
 3 May – Abbas Abdullahi Sheikh Siraji, politician (b. 1985)

See also
 2017 timeline of the War in Somalia

References

 
Years of the 21st century in Somalia
Somalia
Somalia
2010s in Somalia